Gråträsk is a village in Sweden.  It is located in the western part of Piteå kommun in the south of Norrbotten close to the Lappmarksgränsen.

About
Gråträsk is located at an isthmus between the lakes Gråträsket (415 square yards) at the east and Pjesker (410 square yards) at the west. At the southernmost point there is the small lake Vitsjön. At Notviken of Gråträsket is a bath place with a pier, which is a very modern object in Gråträsk. The village is along the Military Road.

External links
 Gråträsk kapell

Populated places in Piteå Municipality